The Electoral Districts Act 1872 (No 27 of 1872) was an act of the Government of South Australia. It increased the size of the House of Assembly to 46 members and defined the boundaries of the districts which elected them. It repealed sections 3 and 4 of the Electoral Act 1861. The Legislative Council continued to be elected by a single electoral district over the entire Province of South Australia. It was to take effect only from the next time the House of Assembly was dissolved or expired.

The Assembly members were to be elected from 22 electoral districts and the First Schedule to the Act specified how many members from each district, as well as defining the boundaries of each district. The Second Schedule specified the polling places to be used for each district, but the list could be changed later.

Electoral districts
Place spelling is displayed as it appeared in the schedule to the Act.

References

South Australia legislation